Ralston Public Schools (RPS, a.k.a. Douglas County School District 0054) is a school district headquartered in Ralston, Nebraska. It also serves southwestern sections of Omaha.

 the district has over 270 teachers with full-time status and about 3,400 students.

History
Jerry Riibe became superintendent circa 2010. In 2013 he announced he was leaving the district, and he became superintendent at the Muscatine Community School District in Iowa.

Schools
 Secondary schools
 Ralston High School
 Ralston Middle School

 Primary schools
 Blumfield Elementary School
 Karen Western Elementary School
 Meadows Elementary School
 Mockingbird Elementary School
 Seymour Elementary School
 Wildewood Elementary School

References

External links
 Ralston Public Schools
School districts in Nebraska
Education in Omaha, Nebraska